The first Amir Sjarifuddin Cabinet was the fifth Indonesian cabinet and was in office from 3 July to 11 November 1947.

Background
Following the resignation of the Third Sjahrir Cabinet on 27 June 1947, President Sukarno called a meeting with the leaders of the Masyumi Party, the Indonesian National Party (PNI), the Socialist Party and the Labour Party to ask them to form a cabinet. However, the party leaders were unable to agree to Masyumi's demands for senior ministerial posts that would have enabled it to dominate the cabinet. Finally, on 3 July, agreement was reached between the PNI, the Socialist Party, the Labour Party and the Masjumi breakaway party, the Indonesian Islamic Union Party (PSII), to support Amir Sjarifuddin as prime minister.

Composition
Nine of the ministers had served in the previous cabinet. The government was intended to be inclusive, with representation from all existing parties and groupings. In the absence of Masjumi, the PSII represented the Muslim bloc.

Cabinet leadership
Prime Minister: Amir Sjarifuddin (Socialist Party)
Deputy Prime Minister: Dr. A. K. Gani (Indonesian National Party – PNI)
Deputy Prime Minister: Setiadjid (PBI)

Departmental Ministers
Minister of Home Affairs: W. Wondoamiseno (Indonesian Islamic Union Party - PSII)     
Minister of Foreign Affairs: Agus Salim
Minister of Welfare: A. K. Gani (PSII)
Minister of Defense: Amir Sjarifuddin (Socialist Party)
Minister of Education: Ali Sastroamidjojo (Indonesian National Party - PNI)
Minister of Finance: A. A. Maramis (PNI)
Minister of Information: Ir. Setiadi Reksoprodjo
Minister of Transportation: Djuanda Kartawidjaja
Minister of Public Works: Mohammad Enoch
Minister of Health: Dr. Johannes Leimena (Parkindo)
Minister of Social Affairs: Soeprodjo (PBI)
Minister of Justice: Soesanto Tirtoprodjo (PNI)
Minister of Religious Affairs: Achmad Asj'ari (PSII)
Minister of Labor: S. K. Trimurti (PBI)

State Ministers (without portfolio)
State Minister: Sri Sultan Hamengkubuwana IX
State Minister: Wikana (Youth Congress Board)
State Minister: Suja'as (Indonesian Peasants Front)
State Minister: Siauw Giok Tjhan
State Minister: Hindromartono (Socialist Party)
State Minister: Maroeto Darusman (Communist Party of Indonesia - PKI)

Junior Ministers
Junior Minister of Home Affairs: Abdul Madjid Djojoadiningrat (Socialist Party)
Junior Minister of Foreign Affairs: Tamzil (Socialist Party)
First Junior Minister of Welfare : Ignatius J. Kasimo (PKRI)
Second Junior Minister of Welfare: Dr. A. Tjokronegoro (Socialist Party)
Junior Minister of Defense: Arudji Kartawinata (PSII)
Junior Minister of Finance: Dr. Ong Eng Djie (Socialist Party)
Junior Minister of Information: Sjahboedin Latif (PSII)
Junior Minister of Public Works: Herling Laoh (PNI)
Junior Minister of Health: Dr. Satrio (PBI)
Junior Minister of Social Affairs: Sukoso Wirjosapitro (PSII)
Junior Minister of Labor: Wilopo (PNI)

On 11 August 1947, Mohammad Enoch resigned and was replaced by his deputy, Herling Laoh.

Cabinet reshuffle
On 11 November 1947, Amir reshuffled the cabinet to allow the inclusion of the Masjumi Party. This meant that the cabinet lasted only four months and eight days.

References
 
 
 P. N. H. Simanjuntak (2003) Kabinet-Kabinet Republik Indonesia: Dari Awal Kemerdekaan Sampai Reformasi (Cabinets of the Republic of Indonesia: From the Beginning of Independence to the Reform Era), Djambatan, Jakarta  Indonesian

Notes

Cabinets of Indonesia
Indonesian National Revolution
1947 establishments in Indonesia
1947 disestablishments in Indonesia
Cabinets established in 1947
Cabinets disestablished in 1947